The Rugby Union of Bosnia and Herzegovina is the governing body for rugby in Bosnia and Herzegovina. It oversees the various national teams and domestic competitions.

Leadership

See also
Rugby union in Bosnia and Herzegovina
Bosnia and Herzegovina national rugby union team
Bosnia and Herzegovina national rugby sevens team
Bosnia and Herzegovina women's national rugby union team

External links
 Rugby Union of Bosnia and Herzegovina 
 Bosnia and Herzegovina at World Rugby 

Sports governing bodies in Bosnia and Herzegovina
B
B
Sports organizations established in 1992